Tritellurium dichloride is the inorganic compound with the formula Te3Cl2. It is one of the more stable lower chlorides of tellurium.

Preparation and properties
Te3Cl2 is a gray solid.  Its structure consists of a long chain of Te atoms, with every third Te center carrying two chloride ligands for the repeat unit -Te-Te-TeCl2-.  It is a semiconductor with a band gap of 1.52 eV, which is larger than that for elemental Te (0.34 eV).  It is prepared by heating Te with the appropriate stoichiometry of chlorine.

Other lower tellurium chlorides
Te2Cl2 is a yellow liquid prepared by reaction of lithium polytellurides with TeCl4.  Te2Cl, also a polymer, is a metastable gray solid, tending to convert to Te3Cl2 and TeCl4.

Tellurium dichloride (TeCl2) is unstable with respect to disproportionation, and has not been isolated as a solid, but has been characterised as the main component of the vapor formed with TeCl4 and hot Te.  Several complexes of it are known and well characterized.  They are prepared by treating tellurium dioxide with hydrochloric acid in the presence of thioureas.  The thiourea serves both as a ligand and as a reductant, converting Te(IV) to Te(II).

References

Chlorides
Nonmetal halides
Tellurium halides
Inorganic polymers
Conductive polymers